Renato Zenobi (born 1961 in Zurich) is a Swiss chemist. He is Professor of Chemistry at ETH Zurich. Throughout his career, Zenobi has contributed to the field of analytical chemistry.

Biography
Zenobi received his MS degree from the ETH Zurich (Switzerland) in 1986 and PhD from the Stanford University (United States) in 1990.
He was postdoctoral fellow at the University of Pittsburgh (United States; 1990–1991) and at the University of Michigan (United States; 1991). In 1992 he worked as Werner Fellow at the École Polytechnique Fédérale de Lausanne (Switzerland). He became assistant professor at the ETH Zurich in 1995, was promoted to associate professor in 1997, and to full professor in 2000. He is one of the associate editors of the Analytical Chemistry journal (ACS).

Research and achievements
Zenobi's research areas include: laser-based analytical chemistry, electrospray and laser-assisted mass spectrometry, laser-surface interactions, near-field optical microscopy / spectroscopy as well as Single-Cell Analysis.

He has made contributions to the understanding of the ion formation mechanism in matrix-assisted laser desorption/ionization (MALDI) mass spectrometry (MS) and to the development of analytical tools for the nanoscale, most notably by inventing tip-enhanced Raman spectroscopy (TERS).

Awards
2015          Fresenius Prize (German Chemical Society / GDCh)
2014          RUSNANO Prize
2014          Thomson Medal (International Mass Spectrometry Foundation)
2012          Fresenius Lectureship (German Chemical Society / GDCh)
2010          Honorary Professorship, Chinese Academy of Sciences (Changchun / CIAC)
2010          Honorary Professorship, Changchun University of Chinese Medicine
2010          Honorary Adjunct Professorship, Hunan University (China)
2010          Mayent/Rothschild Fellowship, Institut Curie (Paris, France)
2009          Honorary Lifetime Membership Israel Chemical Society (Israel)
2009          Schulich Graduate Lectureship Technion, Haifa (Israel)
2007          Honorary Professorship, East China Institute of Technology (Fuzhou, China)
2006          Michael Widmer Award (Novartis Pharma & Swiss Chemical Society)
2006          Hobart H. Willard Lectureship (University of Michigan, Ann Arbor)
2006          Michael Widmer Award (Novartis Pharma & Swiss Chemical Society)
2005          Theophilus Redwood Lecturer (Royal Society of Chemistry)
1998          H.E. Merck Award for Analytical Chemistry
1993          Ruzicka Prize, awarded by ETH Zürich
1991          Alfred-Werner Fellowship
1990          Andrew Mellon Postdoctoral Fellowship
1989          Thomas Hirschfeld Award (Federation of Analytical Chemistry and Spectroscopy Societies, USA)

Key Publications

In the area of Near-Field Optics & Tip-enhanced Raman Spectroscopy:
R. M. Stöckle, C. Fokas, V. Deckert, R. Zenobi, B. Sick. B. Hecht, and U. P. Wild, High Quality Near-Field Optical Probes by Tube Etching, Appl. Phys. Lett. 75, 160-162 (1999).
R. Stöckle, Y. D. Suh, V. Deckert, and R. Zenobi, Nanoscale chemical analysis by Tip-enhanced Raman Scattering, Chem. Phys. Lett. 318, 131-136 (2000).
B. Hecht, B. Sick, U. P. Wild, V. Deckert, R. Zenobi, O. F. Martin, and D.W. Pohl, Scanning Near-Field Optical Microscopy and Spectroscopy with Aperture Probes: Fundamentals and Applications, J. Chem. Phys. 112, 7761-7774 (2000).
W. Zhang, B.-S. Yeo, T. Schmid, and R. Zenobi, Single Molecule Tip-enhanced Raman Spectroscopy with Silver tips, J. Phys. Chem. C 111, 1733-1738 (2007).
B.-S. Yeo, J. Stadler, T. Schmid, and R. Zenobi, Tip-Enhanced Raman Spectroscopy – its Status, Challenges, and Future Directions, Chem. Phys. Lett. 472, 1-13 (2009), “Fontiers” article.

In the area of Mass Spectrometric Analyses of Complex Samples:
M. Kalberer et al., First Identification of Polymers as Major Component of Atmospheric Organic Aerosols, Science 303, 1659-1662 (2004).
R. Zenobi, Single-Cell Metabolomics: Analytical and Biological Perspectives, Science 342, 1243259 (2013).

In the area of Mass Spectrometric Studies of Noncovalent Interactions:
J. M. Daniel, S. D. Friess, S. Rajagopalan, S. Wendt, and R. Zenobi, Quantitative Determination of Noncovalent Binding Interactions using Soft Ionization Mass Spectrometry, Int. J. Mass Spectrom. 216, 1-27 (2002).
V. Frankevich, K. Barylyuk, K. Chingin. R. Nieckarz, and R. Zenobi, Native Molecules in the Gas Phase?  The Case of Green Fluorescent Protein, ChemPhysChem 14, 929-935 (2013).

In the area of MALDI Mass Spectrometry:
R. Knochenmuss and R. Zenobi, MALDI Ionization: In-Plume Processes, Chem. Rev. 103, 441-452 (2003).
R. J. Wenzel, U. Matter, L. Schultheis, and R. Zenobi, Sensitive Analysis of Megadalton Ions using Cryodetection MALDI Time-of-flight Mass Spectrometry, Anal. Chem. 77, 4329 -4373 (2005).

In the area of Ambient Mass Spectrometry:
H. Chen, A. Wortmann, W. Zhang, and R. Zenobi, Rapid in-vivo Finterprinting of Non-volatile Compounds in Breath by Extractive Electrospray Ionization Quadrupole Time-of-Flight Mass Spectrometry, Angew. Chem. Internat. Ed. 119, 580-583 (2007).
H. Chen, S. Yang, A. Wortmann, and R. Zenobi, Neutral Desorption Sampling of Living Objects for Rapid Analysis by Extractive Electrospray Ionization Mass Spectrometry, Angew. Chem. 119, 7735-7738 (2007); Angew. Chem. Int. Ed. 46, 7591-7594 (2007).
H. Chen, G. Gamez, and R. Zenobi, What can we Learn from Ambient Ionization Techniques? J. Am. Soc. Mass Spectrom. (Critical Insight) 20, 1947-1963 (2009)
L. Zhu, G. Gamez, H. Chen, K. Chingin, and R. Zenobi, Rapid Detection of Melamine in Untreated Milk and Wheat Gluten by Ultrasound-assisted Extractive Electrospray Ionization Mass Spectrometry (EESI-MS), Chem. Comm. 559-561 (2009).

See also
 Electrospray ionization
 Matrix-assisted laser desorption/ionization
 Micro-arrays for mass spectrometry

References

Sources
 http://www.loc.ethz.ch/people/professoren/zenobi_EN
 http://pubs.acs.org/page/ancham/editors.html

External links
 

Academic staff of ETH Zurich
Living people
Mass spectrometrists
Swiss chemists
1961 births
University of Michigan fellows
Thomson Medal recipients